Magariños is a surname. Notable people with the surname include:

Alejandro Magariños Cervantes (1825–1893), Uruguayan writer and lawyer
Carlos Alfredo Magariños (born 1962), Argentine politician
Germán Magariños (born 1978), Argentine film director and producer

Galician-language surnames